Westmont High School is located in Campbell, California, United States and is part of the Campbell Union High School District.  First opened in the fall of 1964, Westmont drew students initially from both Blackford and Campbell High Schools.  The school retains many academic achievements including the 1996 California Distinguished School and 1997 National Blue Ribbon School.

The school is also home to the Campbell FFA Future Farmers of America

The school sits at the Northwest corner of the 1839 Alta California land grant, Rancho Rinconada de Los Gatos. San Tomas Aquino Creek wraps around the northern edge of the school and formed the land grant's boundary.

Alumni
Notable alumni at Westmont High School include:
 Steve Cisowski, Class of 1981, an NFL player for the Dallas Cowboys
 Brett Dalton, Class of 2001, an actor. Plays Grant Ward in ABC's Agents of S.H.I.E.L.D
 Andy Dinh, Class of 2010 (dropped out), a professional gamer known as Reginald
 Martin Ferrero, Class of 1966, an actor. He played the ill-fated lawyer in Jurassic Park and also had recurring role on Miami Vice.
 Lars Frederiksen, Class of 1989, guitarist/vocalist for the Punk bands Rancid and Lars Frederiksen and the Bastards.
 Dan Gladden, Class of 1974, a Major League Baseball player and baseball radio commentator
 Dylan Park-Pettiford, Class of 2002, a writer. He wrote for All Rise (TV series) and 68 Whiskey. He is as a storyteller and contributor for The Moth.
 Eric Victorino, Class of 1996, a musician and poet. Was the lead singer for Strata (band) and The Limousines.

See also
 Santa Clara County high schools
 Campbell Union High School District

References

 History of Campbell High Schools
 World of Pageantry - Fall 2004 Scores for Field Show Competitions
 World of Pageantry - Fall 2003 Scores for Field Show Competitions

External links
 Westmont Website
 Westmont Music Department
 Westmont English dept
 Westmont Science dept
 The Shield
 Westmont Speech and Debate
 Westmont Drama dept
 Westmont CSF/Honor Roll
 Westmont Athletics
 Westmont stats on greatschools
 World of Pageantry - Scores for Field Show Competitions
 Westmont Class of 1968 40-year Reunion, August 19, 2008

Educational institutions established in 1964
Campbell Union High School District
High schools in Santa Clara County, California
Public high schools in California
1964 establishments in California